Christian Friedrich (born 6 June 1981) is a German bobsledder who has competed since 2004. His best World Cup finish was second in the four-man event at Whistler in November 2010 and two-man event at Calgary in December 2010.

References

1981 births
Living people
German male bobsledders
21st-century German people